Corypha lecomtei is a species of plant in the family Arecaceae. It is only growing in Thailand, Cambodia and Vietnam. It is threatened by habitat loss.

Corypha lecomtei  (Common name  Cay la buong ) is one of the species used to make palm-leaf manuscripts.

Description
The plant flowers and fruits only once (monocarpy), at between 15 and 30 years of age, and then dies. The fruit is brownish and about 3 inches (7 to 8 cm) long and almost as wide.

References

https://en.wikipedia.org/w/index.php?title=Corypha_lecomtei&action=edit
 Corypha lecomtei. .

lecomtei
Flora of Indo-China
Vulnerable flora of Asia
Taxa named by Odoardo Beccari

à
https://en.wikipedia.org/w/index.php?title=Corypha_lecomtei&action=edit